Parabacillus hesperus, the western short-horn walkingstick, is a species of walkingstick in the family Heteronemiidae. It is found in North America. This species is found in dry, arid in the summer and fall. Their diet consists of various scrub and grassland plants. Through an adaptation called "crypsis," it blends in so perfectly with its natural habitat that it often goes completely undetected by would-be predators.

References

Further reading

External links

 

Phasmatodea
Insects described in 1934